Groza is a Romanian surname. Notable people with the surname include:

Aleksander Groza (1807–1875), Polish poet and writer
Alex Groza (1926–1995), American basketball player
Ana Maria Groza (born 1976), Romanian racewalker
Anca Groza (born 23 1956), Romanian swimmer
Loredana Groza (born 1970), Romanian singer
Lou Groza (1924–2000), American footballer, Hall of Fame placekicker for the Cleveland Browns
Lou Groza Award, annual college football award for best placekicker
Petru Groza (1884–1958), Romanian politician

See also 
Groza, a tributary of the Uz in Bacău County, Romania
OTs-14 Groza, Russian assault rifle
MSP Groza silent pistol
Groza, a Uragan-class guard ship of the Soviet Navy

Romanian-language surnames